Louis Jehotte (7 November 1803 or 1804 – 3 February 1884) was a prominent Belgian sculptor working in a realist tradition that was inflected, who was responsible for the bronze equestrian monument to Charlemagne erected on the  in Liège, Belgium, in 1867. His bronze Cain Cursed stands outside the Academy Palace, and his statue of Prince Charles Alexander of Lorraine on the current /, both in Brussels.

His father Léonard Jehotte (Herstal, 1 August 1772 – Maastricht, 1 August (!) 1851) was an engraver at the mint, in Liège. His son Louis was born in Paris. and studied at the Académie de dessin at Liège under François Joseph Dewandre. He taught sculpture at the Brussels Académie Royale des Beaux-Arts.

Notes

External links

 Jacques Stiennon, 1995. "Les arts plastiques", Wallonie: Atouts et références d'une Région, Freddy Joris, editor, (Gouvernement wallon, Namur)

1804 births
1884 deaths
19th-century Belgian sculptors
19th-century Belgian male artists